Konstantin Dmitriyevich Shostak (born 28 March 2000) is a Belarusian professional ice hockey player currently playing for HC Dinamo Minsk in the Kontinental Hockey League (KHL) on loan from fellow KHL club, Severstal Cherepovets, and the Belarusian national team. He has also formerly played with JYP in the Liiga

Shostak joined Dinamo Minsk on loan from Severstal for the 2022–23 season on 1 June 2022. He represented Belarus at the 2021 IIHF World Championship.

References

External links

2000 births
Living people
Belarusian expatriate ice hockey people
Belarusian expatriate sportspeople in Russia
Belarusian ice hockey goaltenders
HC Dinamo Minsk players
JYP Jyväskylä players
Molot-Prikamye Perm players
Severstal Cherepovets players
Ice hockey people from Minsk